The Warriors EP is an EP by the Christian nu metal band P.O.D.. It was released on November 17, 1998 as a transitional album from Rescue Records to Atlantic Records. The EP contains a message from lead singer Sonny Sandoval thanking the 'Warriors', P.O.D.'s following of fans, for supporting them throughout the years before signing with Atlantic Records. Though produced by Atlantic Records, the album was actually released by Tooth & Nail Records. The entire EP is made to sound like the songs are being played through a phonograph, being mixed with a faux vinyl crackling throughout each song.

Track listing

References

P.O.D. albums
1999 debut EPs
Tooth & Nail Records EPs